Dimitrios Ypsilantis is a former municipality in Kozani regional unit, West Macedonia, Greece. Since the 2011 local government reform it is part of the municipality Kozani, of which it is a municipal unit. It was named after Demetrius Ypsilanti, a 19th-century leader of the Greek struggle for independence. The municipal unit has an area of 112.071 km2. Population 2,335 (2011). The seat of the municipality was in Mavrodendri.

References

Former municipalities in Western Macedonia
Populated places in Kozani (regional unit)

bg:Димитриос Ипсилантис (дем)